Alana de la Garza (born June 18, 1976) is an American actress. She is known for her roles as Connie Rubirosa on the NBC television series Law & Order in its last four seasons through 2010, Law & Order: LA until the show's conclusion in 2011, and in Law & Order: Special Victims Unit. She also portrayed Marisol Delko-Caine on CSI: Miami. In 2014 and 2015, she starred as Detective Jo Martinez in the ABC series Forever. From 2016 to 2017, she starred in Criminal Minds: Beyond Borders as Special Agent Clara Seger. In 2019, she began starring as SAC Isobel Castille on FBI, a role she also plays on the spin-off series FBI: Most Wanted.

Early life
De la Garza was born in Columbus, Ohio, to a Mexican-American father and an Irish-American mother. She was raised in El Paso, Texas.

She won the "Miss Photogenic" title in the Miss El Paso Teen USA local beauty pageant. She became a special-needs teacher and enrolled at the University of Texas at El Paso, studying physical therapy and social work.

After graduation, she landed some small roles while living in Orlando, Florida, then soon after moved to New York City.

Career
In 2001, she was featured in the music video for Brooks & Dunn's song "Ain't Nothing 'bout You". Garza also appeared in the music video "All or Nothing" released by the boy band O-Town in 2001. She obtained the role of Rosa Santos on the soap opera, All My Children, guest-starring roles in JAG, Charmed, Two and a Half Men, and Las Vegas. She starred as Maria in the short-lived television series The Mountain. In 2006, she starred in Mr. Fix-It co-starring David Boreanaz. She also guest-starred as an evil Kryptonian (named "Aethyr" in promotional materials) in the Season 5 premiere episode of Smallville and played the recurring role of Marisol Delko Caine on the CBS television series CSI: Miami. She has twice been featured in the "Girls of Maxim online gallery.

In 2006, she joined the cast of NBC's Law & Order during the premiere of Season 17, portraying Assistant District Attorney Connie Rubirosa. Her performance as ADA Rubirosa has been widely praised by critics. In 2007, she earned a nomination for "Best Supporting Actress—Television" by the Imagen Foundation Awards. Following in 2008, she was nominated for an ALMA Award as "Outstanding Supporting Actress in a Drama Television Series". Later that year, she garnered an "Impact Award" for "Outstanding Performance in a Dramatic Television Series" by the National Hispanic Media Coalition.

De la Garza played Assistant District Attorney (later DDA) Rubirosa for the final four seasons of Law & Order, a role she also played on the short-lived spin-off Law & Order: LA (2011). On January 22, 2014, she guest starred in an episode of Law & Order: Special Victims Unit as Connie Rubirosa. Rubirosa, who had recently departed the Los Angeles District Attorney's Office, is now a federal prosecutor, heading up a joint task force on underage sex trafficking. Her guest appearance first aired on January 22, 2014. This is, to date, her final appearance in the franchise.

In July 2011, de la Garza reprised her role as Marisol Delko Caine, on CSI: Miamis season 10 premiere.

In February 2012, she was cast as a lead in the NBC medical drama pilot Do No Harm. She played Dr. Lena Solis, a neurologist. In June 2012, De La Garza was added to the cast of Are You Here, the feature film debut of Mad Men creator Matthew Weiner.

In 2014–2015 she co-starred as police detective Jo Martinez in the ABC television series Forever. In September 2015, she began a recurring role as the new head of Homeland Security on Scorpion. She appeared in Criminal Minds: Beyond Borders, starring as the female-lead opposite Gary Sinise. In 2019 she was cast in season two of FBI as Isobel Castille.

Personal life
De la Garza married her long time boyfriend, Michael Roberts, a writer, on May 31, 2008, in Orlando, Orange County, Florida. They have a son
and a daughter. She is a distant cousin of TV writer-producer René Balcer, sharing a common relative in Juan Cortina, a Mexican folk hero known as the Rio Grande Robin Hood.

Filmography

Film

Television

References

External links

 

1976 births
Living people
American television actresses
American soap opera actresses
University of Texas at El Paso alumni
Actresses from El Paso, Texas
Actresses from Texas
American actresses of Mexican descent
American people of Irish descent
20th-century American actresses
21st-century American actresses